Turija is a village located in the Srbobran municipality, in the South Bačka District of Serbia. It is situated in the Autonomous Province of Vojvodina. The village has a Serb ethnic majority and its population numbering 2,562 people (2002 census). The village is famous because of the annual sausage festival known as Kobasicijada that is organized in Turija every year.

Historical population

1961: 3,582
1971: 3,242
1981: 2,935
1991: 2,615

See also
Kobasicijada
List of places in Serbia
List of cities, towns and villages in Vojvodina

References
Slobodan Ćurčić, Broj stanovnika Vojvodine, Novi Sad, 1996.

External links 

Turija location map

Places in Bačka
South Bačka District
Srbobran